Cheatham House refers to two NRHP listed Houses:

 Mansfield Cheatham House, Robertson County, Tennessee, NRHP-Nr. 78002626
 John E. Cheatham House, Lafayette County, Missouri, NRHP-Nr. 93000550